John Gutekunst (born April 13, 1944) is an American football coach and former player. He served as the head football coach at the University of Minnesota from 1985 to 1991, compiling a record of 29–37–2.  Gutekunst came to Minnesota in 1984 as an assistant coach and took over as interim head coach in 1985 for the Independence Bowl after Lou Holtz left the team to become the head coach at Notre Dame.  Gutekunst was promoted to head coach before the next season.  He has also served as an assistant coach at Duke University, Virginia Polytechnic Institute and State University, Wake Forest University, Rutgers University, the University of Rhode Island, the University of South Carolina, the University of North Carolina at Chapel Hill, and East Carolina University.  He joined the East Carolina staff in October 2009, taking over for Rock Roggeman, who left on indefinite medical leave. Gutekunst is an alumnus of Duke University, where he played football and baseball.

His son, Brian Gutekunst, is general manager of the Green Bay Packers.

Head coaching record

*Lou Holtz coached the first 11 games of the season.

References	

1944 births
Living people
American football defensive backs
Duke Blue Devils baseball players
Duke Blue Devils football players
Duke Blue Devils football coaches
East Carolina Pirates football coaches
Minnesota Golden Gophers football coaches
North Carolina Tar Heels football coaches
North Carolina A&T Aggies football coaches
Rhode Island Rams football coaches
Rutgers Scarlet Knights football coaches
South Carolina Gamecocks football coaches
Virginia Tech Hokies football coaches
Wake Forest Demon Deacons football coaches
Tampa Bay Storm coaches
People from Sellersville, Pennsylvania
Players of American football from Pennsylvania